Tony Tirado is a Peruvian sports commentator and former football goalkeeper in the North American Soccer League. He was the main soccer sportscaster for Spanish International Network (SIN), the forerunner to Univision, during the 1980s before moving to Telemundo from 1987 to 1994. He covered the 1986 World Cup for SIN alongside Norberto Longo and Jorge Berry.

References

Living people
Peruvian footballers
Peruvian journalists
Male journalists
Peruvian male writers
Miami Toros players
North American Soccer League (1968–1984) commentators
North American Soccer League (1968–1984) players
Association football goalkeepers
Year of birth missing (living people)
Peruvian expatriate footballers
Expatriate soccer players in the United States